This is a list of Muskingum University alumni.

Government and politics
 Annie Glenn (class of 1941), civic leader; wife of John Glenn
 John Glenn (class of 1942), former astronaut, Democratic U.S. Senator from Ohio (1975-1999), candidate for 1984 Democratic presidential nomination
 President Warren G. Harding (via Muskingum's assumption of Ohio Central College)
 Earl R. Lewis (class of 1911), former Republican U.S. Representative from Ohio, 1939–40 and 1943–48
 Sean Logan (class of 1988), current Director of the Ohio Department of Natural Resources; former Columbiana County, Ohio Commissioner
 Francis Scott McBride (class of 1895), leader of prohibition; longtime National Superintendent of the U.S. Anti-Saloon League
 John Willis Menard (via Iberia College and Ohio Central College), first African-American to address the U.S. House of Representatives, in 1869
 C. Ellis Moore (class of 1907), Republican U.S. Representative from Ohio, 1919-1933
 Charles J. Pilliod, Jr. (class of 1941), United States Ambassador to Mexico, 1986-1989
 Robert T. Secrest (class of 1926), Democratic U.S. Representative from Ohio, 1933-1967
 Wilbur F. Simlik (class of 1943), Major general in the Marine Corps
 Robert M. Warner (class of 1949), sixth Archivist of the United States

Entertainment

 Jack Hanna (class of 1969), former Columbus Zoo and Aquarium director; television personality
 Agnes Moorehead (class of 1923), Emmy Award-winning actress (Bewitched); member of the Delta Gamma Theta Sorority

Arts

 David Budbill (class of 1962), poet, author and playwright
 Laurence Overmire (valedictorian, class of 1979), poet, author, actor, playwright
Helen Camille Stanley (class of 1961) composer, violist

Education

 Dennis D. Berkey (class of 1969), President, Worcester Polytechnic Institute
 William Rainey Harper (class of 1870), first President, University of Chicago
 Richard Pipes (class of 1944), Professor of History Emeritus, Harvard University
 William Oxley Thompson (class of 1870), President of Ohio State University and Miami University

Business

 Philip Caldwell (class of 1940), retired CEO of Ford Motor Company
 Alfred S. Warren, Jr. (class of 1948), retired Vice President of Industrial Relations for General Motors Motors

Sports

Darrell Hazell (class of 1986), wide receivers coach for the Minnesota Vikings of the NFL
 Jim Heacock (class of 1970), defensive coordinator and defensive line coach at Ohio State University
 Jon Heacock, defensive coordinator at Iowa State University
 Edgar "Ed" Sherman (class of 1936), legendary Muskingum head football coach for 22 years; College Football Hall of Fame inductee
 Tim Timmons, Major League Baseball umpire
 Brandon Todd, known as the 5'5'' dunker, played for the 2001, 2002, and 2003 All-Ohio team with LeBron James; developed an athletic training program called "FlytRight"
 Tyson Veidt, associate head coach and linebackers coach at Iowa State University

Science
John Glenn (class of 1942), first American to orbit the earth, oldest man ever in space
Charles E. Waring (class of 1931), chemistry professor at the University of Connecticut

References

Muskingum University alumni